Cristina Pomacu (born 15 September 1973 in Calafat, Dolj) is a female long-distance runner from Romania who mainly competed in the marathon. She is a triple winner of the annual Belgrade Marathon (1994, 2000 and 2001), and twice won the silver medal at the IAAF World Half Marathon Championships (1995 and 1997).

Pomacu competed in the women's marathon at the 1994 European Athletics Championships (taking 24th place) and was chosen to represent Romania at the 1996 Atlanta Olympics (although she failed to finish the race). She was ever present at the World Half Marathon Championships from 1995 to 2000 and frequently finished in the top ten, forming part of a strong Romanian women's team.

Achievements

External links

1973 births
Living people
Romanian female long-distance runners
Athletes (track and field) at the 1996 Summer Olympics
Olympic athletes of Romania
People from Calafat